CSUF may refer to:

 California State University, Fresno
 California State University, Fullerton